Matej Češík (born 26 June 1988) is a Slovak professional ice hockey player who is currently playing for HK Spišská Nová Ves of the Slovak 1. Liga.

He previously played in the Slovak Extraliga for HC Slovan Bratislava, HC '05 Banská Bystrica and HC Košice.

Career statistics

Regular season and playoffs

International

References

External links

1988 births
Living people
HC '05 Banská Bystrica players
HC Košice players
MHk 32 Liptovský Mikuláš players
Slovak ice hockey centres
HC Slovan Bratislava players
Orli Znojmo players
HK Dukla Michalovce players
HK Spišská Nová Ves players
Sportspeople from Banská Bystrica
Slovak expatriate ice hockey players in the Czech Republic